John Joseph Miller (also known as J.J. Miller, John J. Miller, and John Jos Miller), was born on March 28, 1954 in New York state, and died January 5, 2022 at his home in Albuquerque, New Mexico.

He was a science fiction author known for his work in the long-running (since 1987) Wild Cards shared universe series of original anthologies and novels, edited by George R. R. Martin. He published nine novels, 31 short stories, and eight comic book stories. He also wrote GURPS Wild Cards, a supplement for the GURPS role-playing system published in 1989, and two Wild Cards world books and histories published by Green Ronin.

Miller was a Fellow of the Society for American Baseball Research (SABR) and was an authority on America's Negro league baseball of the 20th Century. He was also a longtime fan and ardent follower of the New York Mets baseball team.

References

External links

1954 births
20th-century American novelists
21st-century American novelists
American male novelists
American science fiction writers
GURPS writers
Living people
American male short story writers
20th-century American short story writers
21st-century American short story writers
20th-century American male writers
21st-century American male writers